Astus is a genus of flowering plants belonging to the family Myrtaceae.

Its native range is Southwest Australia.

Species:

Astus duomilia 
Astus subroseus 
Astus tetragonus 
Astus wittweri

References

Myrtaceae
Myrtaceae genera
Endemic flora of Southwest Australia